This article describes the knockout stage of the 2018–19 Women's EHF Champions League.

Qualified teams
The top four placed teams from each of the two main round groups advanced to the knockout stage.

Format
The first-placed team of each group faced the fourth-placed team, and the second-placed team played against the third-placed team from the other group. After that a draw was held to determine the pairings for the final four.

Quarterfinals

Overviews

|}

Matches

Metz Handball won 54–48 on aggregate.

Győri ETO KC won 62–49 on aggregate.

Rostov-Don won 62–48 on aggregate.

Vipers Kristiansand won 49–37 on aggregate.

Final four
The final four was held at the László Papp Budapest Sports Arena in Budapest, Hungary on 11 and 12 May 2019. The draw took place on 16 April 2019.

Bracket

Semifinals

Third place game

Final

References

knockout stage